Espe may refer to:

Escuela Politécnica del Ejército, also called ESPE, a higher education university in Sangolquí, Ecuador
Espe (Fulda), a river in Hesse, Germany, tributary of the Fulda
Espe (manor house), a historic estate in Boeslunde, Slagelse Municipality, Denmark
Vidsel Air Base, ICAO airport code ESPE, a Swedish Air Force airfield located near Vidsel
Espe, Denmark, a village on the island Funen, Denmark
Espe, Norway, a village in the county of Hordaland, Norway, see list of villages in Hordaland
Aaron Espe (born 1981), American singer-songwriter, instrumentalist and record producer